Gordon McDonald (2 February 1878 – 23 May 1938) was a Canadian amateur soccer player who competed in the 1904 Summer Olympics. In 1904 he was a member of the Galt F.C. team, which won the gold medal in the soccer tournament, scoring one goal in a 7–0 win over the United States, represented by Christian Brothers College.

References

External links

1878 births
1938 deaths
Canadian soccer players
Footballers at the 1904 Summer Olympics
Olympic gold medalists for Canada
Olympic soccer players of Canada
Olympic medalists in football
Association football forwards
Medalists at the 1904 Summer Olympics